Herbert Graves Winful (born 3 December 1952) is a Ghanaian-American engineering professor, whose numerous honours include in 2020 the Quantum Electronics Award. He is the Joseph E. and Anne P. Rowe Professor of Electrical Engineering, Arthur F. Thurnau Professor of Electrical Engineering and Computer Science, and a Professor of Physics at the University of Michigan.

Early years and education
Winful was born in London, England, to Margaret Ferguson Graves, a teacher, and Herbert Francis, an engineer. Winful grew up in Cape Coast, Ghana, where he attended Catholic Jubilee School and St Augustine's College. In 1975 he earned a BS in electrical engineering from the Massachusetts Institute of Technology (MIT) (where he was mentored by Hermann A. Haus), followed by an M.S. in Electrical Engineering (1977) and a PhD in 1981 from the University of Southern California. From 1980 to 1986, Winful was a Principal Member of Technical Staff at GTE Laboratories in Waltham, Massachusetts, conducting research in fiber optics and semiconductor laser physics.

Career
In 1987 Winful took up the post of associate professor in the Electrical Engineering and Computer Sciences (EECS) department at the University of Michigan, and was promoted to become a full professor in 1992, then a year later promoted to an endowed professorship as Thurnau Professor.

As noted by Anis Haffar: "His many contributions to photonics and quantum electronics include pioneering work on nonlinear optical periodic structures; the nonlinear dynamics of coherently coupled laser arrays; the physics of quantum tunneling time; polarization instabilities and distributed-feedback fiber Raman lasers."

A close colleague at the University of Michigan was Gérard Mourou, who in 2018 was co-winner of the Nobel Prize in Physics for the invention of a technique known as Chirped Pulse Amplification.

Having published more than 130 journal articles and supervised the research of PhD students, Winful is himself the recipient of many awards, most recently the 2020 IEEE Photonics Society Quantum Electronics Award, which he was given "for pioneering the field of nonlinear optical periodic structures and for foundational contributions to nonlinear dynamics of semiconductor laser arrays". 

Among his other distinctions are the EECS Outstanding Achievement Award, the College of Engineering Teaching Excellence and Service Excellence Awards, the Provost's Teaching Innovation Prize, the Amoco/University of Michigan Teaching Excellence Award, the State of Michigan Teaching Excellence Award, and the Raymond J. and Monica E. Schultz Outreach and Diversity Award, as well as twice voted Professor of the Year in Electrical Engineering and Computer Science, and named the Tau Beta Pi Outstanding Professor in the College of Engineering.

In January 2021, he was a recipient of the University of Michigan North Campus Deans' MLK Spirit Award, given to those "who exemplify the leadership and vision of Dr. Martin Luther King, Jr."

In November 2022, Winful was inducted as a Fellow of the Ghana Academy of Arts and Sciences (GAAS).

Family and personal life
Winful's mother was the headmistress of St. Michael's School in Cape Coast, and his father was a civil engineer who worked on the Akosombo Dam during its construction and later become executive secretary of the Volta River Authority.

Winful is also a musician, during his Cape Coast school days playing rhythm guitar in a pop band, as well as organ in church. He continues to play the piano recreationally —  including the music of Bach, Chopin and Brahms, as well as his own compositions — and has said: "It is my greatest joy, next to my work." Winful performed one of his own original compositions at a party attended by some two hundred people in celebration of Gérard Mourou's 2018 Nobel win, and also honoured Mourou with the gift of a piece of Kente cloth.

Selected honours and recognition 
 Member, The Electromagnetics Academy
 Presidential Young Investigator, 1987
 Fellow, Optical Society of America, 1990
 Teaching Excellence Award, College of Engineering, 1990
 Professor of the Year, EECS Department, 1991
 State of Michigan Teaching Excellence Award, 1991
 Professor of the Year, EECS Department, 1993
 Fellow of the Institute of Electrical and Electronics Engineers, 1994
 Faculty Advisor of the Year, 1993–1994
 Tau Beta Pi Outstanding Professor Award, 1993–1994
 Amoco/University Faculty Teaching Award, 1993–1994
 Fellow of the American Physical Society, 2002
 Institute of Electrical and Electronics Engineers (IEEE) Photonics Society Quantum Electronics Award, 2020
 North Campus Deans' MLK Spirit Award, 2021
 Fellow, Ghana Academy of Arts and Sciences, 2022

Publications

Selected articles
 (With D. T. Walton) "Passive Mode Locking with an Active Nonlinear Directional Coupler: Positive Group-Velocity Dispersion", Optics Letters, 18, 720–722 (1 May 1993).
 (With S. Feng and R. W. Hellwarth) "Gouy Shift and Temporal Reshaping of Focused Single-cycle Electromagnetic Pulses", Optics Letters., 23, 385 (1998).
 (With S. Hunsche, S. Feng, A. Leitenstorfer, E. P. Ippen, and M. C. Nuss) "Spatiotemporal Focusing of Single-cycle Light Pulses", submitted to Optics Letters (1998).
 (With S. Feng and R. W. Hellwarth) "Spatiotemporal Evolution of Single-cycle Electromagnetic Pulses", submitted to Physical Review E (1998).
 (With S. Feng) "Fields of Single-cycle Terahertz Pulses Generated by a Loop Antenna", in CLEO '98 Proceedings (May 1998).
 "Physical mechanism for apparent superluminality in barrier tunneling", in Conference on Lasers and Electro-Optics/Quantum Electronics and Laser Science Conference, Technical Digest (Optical Society of America, 2003), paper QFA5. DOI: 10.1109/QELS.2003.238281.
 "Apparent superluminality and the generalized Hartman effect in double-barrier tunneling", in Physical Review E 72(4), October 2005. DOI: 10.1103/PhysRevE.72.046608.
 "Tunneling time, the Hartman effect, and superluminality: A proposed resolution of an old paradox", Physics Reports 436 (1–2), pp. 1–69 (2006). DOI: 10.1016/j.physrep.2006.09.002.
 "Compressing light and sound through chirpedpulse stimulated brillouin scattering", Optics Infobase Conference Papers (2013).
 "Chirped Brillouin dynamic gratings for storing and compressing light". Optics Express 21: 10039-47 (2013).  DOI: 10.1364/OE.21.010039.
 (With M. Dong) "Unified approach to cascaded stimulated Brillouin scattering and frequency-comb generation", Physical Review A – Atomic, Molecular, and Optical Physics 93 (2016). DOI: 10.1103/PhysRevA.93.043851.

References

Further reading
Anis Haffar, "Ghanaian engineering professor wins 'Quantum Electronics Award'", Education Matters, 16 July 2020.

External links
 Herbert Winful at Michigan Engineering.
 "How Hidden Passions Connect People | Herbert Winful | TEDxUofM". 1 April 2015.

1952 births
Electrical engineering academics
Fellow Members of the IEEE
Fellows of the American Physical Society
Fellows of Optica (society)
Ghanaian academics
Ghanaian computer scientists
IEEE award recipients
Living people
MIT School of Engineering alumni
People from Cape Coast
St. Augustine's College (Cape Coast) alumni
University of Michigan faculty
University of Southern California alumni